Phyllomeniidae is a family of molluscs belonging to the order Sterrofustia.

Genera:
 Harpagoherpia Salvini-Plawen, 1978
 Lituiherpia Salvini-Plawen, 1978
 Ocheyoherpia Salvini-Plawen, 1978
 Phyllomeni  Thiele, 1913
 Plicaherpia Garcia-Álvarez, Zamarro & Urgorri, 2010

References

Sterrofustia